Ethiope West is a Local Government Area of Delta State, Nigeria. Its headquarters are in the town of Oghara Town.
 
It has an area of 536 km and a population of 203,592 at the 2006 census.

The postal code of the area is 331.

References

Local Government Areas in Delta State